Michael D. Shear is an American journalist who is a White House correspondent for The New York Times. He previously worked at The Washington Post, where he was part of the Pulitzer Prize-winning team that covered the Virginia Tech shooting in 2007. He regularly appears on CNN and MSNBC.

Early life and education 
Raised in the San Francisco Bay Area, Shear attended Homestead High School in Cupertino, California. Shear received a Bachelor of Arts degree from Claremont McKenna College in 1990 and a master's in public policy from the John F. Kennedy School at Harvard University.

Career 
Shear's reporting career began in 1989, when he was a junior in college and interned at the Los Angeles Times Washington bureau covering hearings on Capitol Hill and other high-profile stories, including the trial of Oliver North and the anniversary of cameras in Congress. After graduation, he worked briefly as a reporter for the San Jose Mercury News before returning to full-time education to pursue a degree in public policy.

He returned to reporting by first writing for The Tampa Tribune before taking up a more permanent role as a metro reporter at The Washington Post in 1992. He was part of the team that won a Pulitzer Prize in 2008 for coverage of the Virginia Tech shootings.

In 2010, Shear moved to the Washington bureau of The New York Times as a political correspondent. He covered Barack Obama's re-election campaign in 2012 and in 2013 returned to his role as a White House correspondent for the Times. He covered the 2016 presidential election. After the election, Shear reported on domestic policy and President Donald J. Trump. He also made regular appearances as a political commentator on radio and television.

His book, Border Wars: Inside Trump's Assault on Immigration, co-written with Julie Hirschfield Davis, was published by Simon & Schuster in October 2019.

In October 2020, Shear tested positive for COVID-19.

Personal life 
Shear lives with his wife and two teenage children in Virginia.

References

External links 
 Michael D. Shear on Twitter
 

Claremont McKenna College alumni
Harvard Kennedy School alumni
Living people
The Washington Post people
The New York Times people
21st-century American journalists
Year of birth missing (living people)